Scott Ramsay (born 16 October 1980) is an English footballer.

Brighton & Hove Albion
Scott Started his football career at Brighton & Hove Albion in 1999, making 2 goals in 35 appearances, 12 of which were first team starts. He had a 3-month loan spell at Yeovil Town in 2001 scoring 4 goals in 17 games. Followed by another loan spell at Bognor Regis. Failing to make the first team Scott was released by Micky Adams after a breach of his contract in 2001. 
On leaving Brighton & Hove Albion he joined Dover Athletic on a free transfer

Non League
Ramsay played 13 games at Dover Athletic scoring only a single goal in a five-month spell before transferring back to East Sussex signing to Eastbourne Borough, who were then in the Southern League.

In 2003, Brentford sparked an interest in signing Scott for £25,000 after scoring 33 goals in the 2002/2003 season. Ramsay took two training sessions with the Bees, but Scott was reluctant to sign.

In the six years at Eastbourne Borough, Scott bagged 135 goals in 283 appearances, and helped the sussex side win the Sussex Senior Cup in 2002 and into the FA Cup first round in 2006 for the first time in the club's history. He also aided their rise into the Conference South football league and was part of the team that won a promotion into the Conference National league.

In June 2008, Ramsay left Eastbourne Borough after failing to agree to a new contract, signing for Hastings United, who "beat off competition from several higher league sides", such as AFC Wimbledon and Havant & Waterlooville to sign the prolific striker. Whilst at Hastings he converted to a central defensive role from his more familiar role as a striker.

In 2010, Ramsay moved to Rye United and played at the club until 2012.

Honours
Brighton & Hove Albion
 Football League Third Division champions: 2000–01

Eastbourne Borough
 Southern League Eastern Division runners up: 2002–03
 Conference South play-off winners: 2007–08

References

External links

Profile – Brighton & Hove Albion.

1980 births
Living people
Sportspeople from Hastings
English footballers
Association football forwards
Brighton & Hove Albion F.C. players
Yeovil Town F.C. players
Bognor Regis Town F.C. players
Dover Athletic F.C. players
Eastbourne Borough F.C. players
Hastings United F.C. players
Rye United F.C. players
English Football League players
Southern Football League players
National League (English football) players